The PsychENCODE Consortium was founded by the U.S. National Institutes of Health in 2015 to study the role of rare genetic variants involved in several psychiatric disorders. PsychENCODE aims to create a public resource of genomic data gathered from 1,000 healthy and disease-affected post-mortem brains reflecting different developmental periods.

PsychENCODE will first focus on autism spectrum disorder, bipolar disorder, and schizophrenia, and then move on to other disorders.

Participating organizations
As of December 2018, participating organizations include:

 Duke University
 Icahn School of Medicine at Mount Sinai
 Johns Hopkins University
 Lieber Institute for Brain Development
 Mayo Clinic
 National Institute of Mental Health
 Sage Bionetworks
 SUNY Downstate Medical University
 SUNY Upstate Medical University
 University of California Los Angeles
 University of Chicago
 University of Illinois
 University of Massachusetts Medical School
 University of North Carolina
 University of Southern California
 Yale University

References

Consortia in the United States
2015 establishments in the United States
National Institutes of Health
Psychiatric research